General elections were held in Ecuador on 7 February 2021, established by the National Electoral Council (CNE) as the date for the first round of the presidential election and a vote on mining in Cuenca. Incumbent president Lenín Moreno, who had held the office since his victory over Guillermo Lasso in 2017, did not seek reelection. Although delaying the election due to the COVID-19 pandemic was discussed, the CNE announced on 15 December 2020 that the electoral calendar would not shift and confirmed elections would take place in February 2021.

In first round results, Andrés Arauz had a significant but not large enough lead to avoid a runoff with Lasso, who had narrowly beaten third-place finisher Yaku Pérez. Final results were delayed due to a requested recount of votes in some provinces. On 19 February, the CNE confirmed Lasso would be Arauz's rival in the second round. On 11 April, Lasso defeated Arauz, which some news outlets called an upset victory. Lasso was inaugurated on 24 May.

Background
The previous Ecuadorian general election, on 19 February 2017 (alongside a referendum on tax havens) saw voters elect a new president and National Assembly. Incumbent President Rafael Correa, of the PAIS Alliance, had already served two terms and was ineligible for reelection. In the first round of presidential elections, PAIS Alliance candidate Lenín Moreno received 39% of the vote. Although he was more than 10% ahead of his nearest rival, Guillermo Lasso of the Creating Opportunities party, he was short of the 40% threshold required to avoid a run-off, and a second round was held on 2 April. In the second round Moreno was elected president with 51.16% of the vote; the National Electoral Council announced on 13 April that it would recount all ballots contested by both parties (accounting to about 10% of the total vote), after which Moreno  was awarded an additional 1,594 votes and retained his majority.

Incumbent president Lenín Moreno's approval rating dropped drastically from 77% after his election in 2017 to only 7% of approval by end of 2019.

Francis Fukuyama described 2020 as having brought "mostly bad news regarding the state of global democracy" in a Wall Street Journal article on 15 Dec of the same year, specifically citing Ecuador as an example of "severe crises of authority" due to the economic recession triggered by the COVID-19 pandemic.

Electoral system
The president is elected using a modified two-round system, with a candidate required to get over 50% of the vote, or get over 40% of the vote and be 10% ahead of their nearest rival to be elected in the first round. The president is limited to two consecutive four-year terms.

Members of the National Assembly are elected by three methods. Fifteen are elected by closed list proportional representation in a nationwide constituency. Six are elected by overseas voters (two each from Canada/United States, Latin America and Asia/Europe/Oceania). The remaining 116 members are elected from multi-member constituencies by closed list proportional representation, with all seats allocated using the Webster method. Members of the National Assembly are limited to two four-year terms, either consecutive or not. There are gender quotas for the party lists, meaning there is alternation between men and women. There are no quotas for minority representation.

Alongside the presidential and legislative elections, a referendum was held in the city of Cuenca, asking voters whether to prohibit mining near five different rivers to protect the ecosystem. The voters were asked to answer yes or no to prohibit mining in each area.

Presidential candidates

Andrés Arauz 

As ex-president Rafael Correa's Citizen Revolution Movement party (a breakaway from the ruling PAIS Alliance) was unable to register as a party, on 18 August 2020 the political coalition Unión por la Esperanza (UNES), comprising the parties  (a Guayas-based centrist party led by Jimmy Jairala) and Fuerza Compromiso Social (a centre-left party that before 2018 had been opposed to Correa), announced that its presidential candidate would be former Correa minister Andrés Arauz with Correa as his running mate. Arauz is an economist, previously a banker (until 2015) and Minister of Knowledge and Human Talent from 2015 to 2017, and a "largely unknown" political figure. However, the vice presidential position on the ticket for Correa, president of Ecuador from 2007 to 2017, was rejected by Ecuador's National Electoral Council (CNE), as he had been convicted for corruption. Carlos Rabascall was then selected as Arauz's running mate.

Arauz has promised to scrap the current International Monetary Fund (IMF) austerity plan approved by the incumbent president, stating it will undermine Ecuadorian families and growth and that it has been overly favorable to creditors. He wants to continue making debts payments to bondholders but says that public spending would take priority. He wants to respect existing mining concessions, but would seek greater community participation and conduct reviews of compliance with environmental and investment plans. Arauz has also promised to give one million families a $1,000 payment in the first week of office. He has also proposed transforming the current extractivist model toward a model based on the knowledge economy and biodiversity. When asked about decriminalizing abortion, he has stated that he personally believes it should be allowed in certain circumstances, but that a debate about it should be promoted by society. Electoral authorities announced on 5 February that Arauz, who then led in the polls, would not be allowed to vote because his main residency is registered in Mexico where he completed his PhD.

Guillermo Lasso

Alianza CREO-PSC, a coalition of the centre-right/conservative Movimiento CREO and Partido Social Cristiano parties, advanced businessman and candidate in the previous two elections Guillermo Lasso as its candidate, with Alfredo Borrero Vega as vice-presidential candidate. Lasso proposes a government plan focused on job creation, promising that through the opening of the market and relaxation of hiring, it will be possible to create 2 million new jobs in the country, promote foreign investment, economic liberalization, greater partnership between the public and private sectors, economic reactivation through the reduction of taxes, implementation of free zones, concession the management of public companies to the private sector, fight against corruption and guarantee a better public health service coordinated by its vice-presidential candidate Alfredo Borrero through the concession of these services to the private sector. He also adopted proposals from Social Christian leader Jaime Nebot like the implementation of 40,000 free internet points throughout the country, public telemedicine application and proposed 400,000 poor families in the country receive a free computer, in addition to focusing on public policies on promotion and training in technology and use of networks for study. He wants to reform and reduce taxation and provide credit for the agriculture sector. He has also said that he will not disavow the agreement with the IMF and respect the debt restructuring agreed to by the previous presidency, but will not raise the VAT tax. Days before the first round, Lasso proposed increasing the unified basic salary to $500.

Lasso is a staunch opponent of abortion in all cases and believes in support for human life from conception to death.

Yaku Pérez Guartambel 

Indigenous activist and former prefect of Azuay Province, Yaku Pérez Guartambel is the candidate for the Pachakutik Plurinational Unity Movement – New Country (MUPP). Molecular biologist Virna Cedeño Escobar decided to accept the offer to be the party's candidate for vice president after first being reluctant. Pérez states that he is from "the ecological left that defends the rights of people and nature and understands indigenous communities", and positions himself as giving voters an alternative to the "authoritarian and corrupt left" of former president Correa. Pérez has proposed a ban on all mining activity and to limit oil extraction, and has been critical of China's policies around extractivism and human rights. He has promised to review the agreements with the IMF, and to not pay any "illegitimate debt", refusing to meet with IMF officials when they visited the country in Sep. In an interview, he has expressed openness to a trade deal with the United States under the right conditions. He has expressed support for allowing abortion in cases of rape or when there are serious risk to the health of the mother or fetus, suggesting a referendum on the issue. His economic plan included universal basic income.

Others 
Other presidential candidates included the following:
On 22 August, anti-abortion activist Martha Cecilia Villafuerte announced her candidacy as vice-president alongside presidential candidate Gerson Almeida, on the Ecuatoriano Unido ticket.
Pedro Freile Vallejo was the candidate from the AMIGO Movement party, with vice president Byron Solís Figueroa, who accepted his nomination on 24 August.
Isidro Romero announced his run as the Avanza party candidate in Sep.
On 8 Oct, María Sara Jijón announced her candidacy as vice president, on the Izquierda Democrática ticket, with the independent presidential candidate, businessman and engineer Xavier Hervas Mora.
On 16 Oct, Carlos Sagnay de la Bastida became the candidate for Partido Fuerza Ec.
Lucio Gutiérrez Borbúa, the former president of Ecuador, was the candidate from the Sociedad Patriótica party.
Alianza Honestidad, the coalition of the Partido Socialista Ecuatoriano and Concertación parties, nominated César Montúfar Mancheno, with vice presidential nominee Julio Villacreses Guillém.
The Unión Ecuatoriana candidate was Giovanny Andrade Salvador, whose running mate was Katherine Mata.
Democracia Sí announced Gustavo Larrea Cabrera as its presidential candidate, with Alexandra Peralta Marín as vice-presidential candidate.
Partido SUMA's candidate is Guillermo Celi Santos, with Verónica Sevilla Ledergerber as his running mate.
Movimiento Construye's candidate was Juan Fernando Velasco Torres, with Ana María Pesántes Salazar as his running mate.
Juntos Podemos nominated Paúl Carrasco Carpio, with vice presidential nominee Frank Vargas Anda.
The party of incumbent president Moreno, Alianza PAIS, nominated Ximena Peña Pacheco, with Patricio Barriga Jaramillo as her running mate.

Endorsements 

After the confirmation from the electoral commission that the second round would be between Arauz and Lasso, both the Pachakutik movement and CONAIE announced they would promote a null vote in the second round, stating that they did not feel represented by either Lasso or Arauz. Meanwhile, Pérez' running mate Virna Cedeño stated that she would vote for Lasso.

President of CONAIE Jaime Vargas later came out in support of Arauz in the second round during an event with Arauz.

Fourth-place finisher Hervas announced he would support a vote for Lasso in the second round, stating that he did not want to support "the authoritarian model that ruled us" and that Lasso had incorporated some of his issues into his policy proposals. The party backing his run, ID, ruled out supporting either candidate.

Arauz also received support from first-round candidates Ximena Peña of the PAIS Alliance and Isidro Romero, but not from Avanza movement itself who were backing Romero's campaign which did not endorse anyone.

Lasso received the backing from first-round candidates Pedro Freile of the Amigo movement, Lucio Gutiérrez of Sociedad Patriótica, César Montúfar of Alianza Honestidad, Gustavo Larrea of Democracia Sí, Guillermo Celi of Partido SUMA and Paúl Carrasco of Juntos Podemos.

Opinion polls

First round

Second round

Results

President
Preliminary results indicated that Andrés Arauz had a significant lead, but his vote total did not reach the 40% required to avoid a runoff, where he will face off against the second-place candidate. While early results had Yaku Pérez narrowly ahead of Lasso in second place, he eventually slipped to third place by about twenty thousand votes, prompting him to request a recount. The final results remained pending for a week due to Pérez's requested recount of 100% of the votes in Guayas Province and 50% of the votes in 16 other provinces, which was also agreed to by Lasso. Lasso later retracted his support for the recount. Later, fourth-place finisher Xavier Hervas also called for a total recount of the presidential votes.

In a press conference together with indigenous leaders on 17 February, Pérez stated that he would not support Lasso in the near future. Pérez insisted that fraud had been committed, especially in the provinces of Guayas, Manabí and Los Ríos. Pérez also claimed that the electoral authorities had colluded with other political actors. The leader of Pachakutik, Marlon Santi, also warned that if the recount request was not granted, indigenous bases would be mobilized. On 18 February, a group of indigenous people started Maring from Saraguro towards Quito. The group, including Yaku Pérez, arrived in the capital 23 February, delivering a large number of documents that they claimed indicated irregularities in the National Electoral Council (CNE in Spanish).

On 19 February, the CNE confirmed Lasso as Arauz's opponent in the second round scheduled for 11 April.

The second round took place on 11 April. Shortly after 21:00 local time and after the polls closed at 17:00, with 97% of the votes counted, Guillermo Lasso was proclaimed the winner of the elections with 52.21% of the votes obtained and winning in 17 of the 24 provinces. Arauz acknowledged the defeat and said he would call the winner Lasso the following day to do so personally and show him that "[his] democratic convictions of being able to continue contributing to the development of the country when it is about benefiting the majority of our people and to oppose constructively and responsibly when it seeks to simply attend to privileges."

First round by province

Second round by province

National Assembly

Andean Parliament 
On 7 February 2021, Ecuadorian voters also elected five members of the Andean Parliament.  Two of the successful candidates were current National Assembly members: Verónica Arias (CD) and Cristina Reyes (PSC).

Cuenca mining referendum
In the referendum held in Cuenca, preliminary results showed 80.9% of voters voting in favor of prohibiting mining activity in the area.

Notes

References

Ecuador
General election
Elections in Ecuador
Ecuador